Navid Nasimi (born 1 March 1995) is a Ukrainian footballer of Iranian descent who plays for Chaika.

Career
Nasimi is a product of the youth team systems of FC Lider Petropavlivska Borschahivka. He played at the amateur level until March 2013, when he signed a contract with FC Chornomorets Odesa.

He made his debut for FC Chornomorets Odesa in a game against FC Olimpik Donetsk on 18 July 2015 in the Ukrainian Premier League.

Career statistics

References

External links

Profile at FFU Official Site (Ukr)

1995 births
Living people
Ukrainian footballers
Ukrainian people of Iranian descent
FC Chornomorets Odesa players
FC Hirnyk-Sport Horishni Plavni players
FC Arsenal Kyiv players
SC Chaika Petropavlivska Borshchahivka players
Ukrainian Premier League players
Ukrainian First League players
Footballers from Kyiv
Sportspeople of Iranian descent

Association football forwards